Albert "Berre" Heremans (13 April 1906 – 15 December 1997) was a Belgian footballer born in Merchtem (Belgium). He was a defender for Daring Club Bruxelles and Belgium before World War II.

He played seven times for the Diables Rouges from 1931 to 1934. He played as a striker in one match for Belgium in the 1934 World Cup, in Florence, against Germany (lost, 2–5).

Honours 
 Belgian international from 1931 to 1934 (7 caps)
 Selected for the 1934 World Cup (played one match)
 Belgian Champions in 1936 and 1937 with Daring Club Bruxelles
 Winner of the Belgian Cup in 1935 with Daring Club Bruxelles

References

External links 
 
 

Belgian footballers
Belgium international footballers
1934 FIFA World Cup players
1906 births
1997 deaths
Association football defenders